Onyeama is a Nigerian surname. Notable people with the surname include:

 Charles Onyeama (1917–1999), Nigerian politician
 Dillibe Onyeama (born 1951), Nigerian author and publisher
 Geoffrey Onyeama (born 1956), Nigerian politician

See also
 Onyema

Surnames of Nigerian origin